White Light Rock & Roll Review is Matthew Good's second album as a solo artist, and was released on June 15, 2004. Though not as well-received as his previous solo effort, Avalanche, it quickly achieved Gold certification in Canada.

Recording sessions for White Light Rock & Roll Review began less than a year after the release of Avalanche, making it the shortest time spent between records for Good. Having become disenchanted with the state of recorded music, Good became enamored with the techniques employed by classic artists like Led Zeppelin and The Who, who spent much of their careers perfecting their live shows and recording albums live off the floor. To this end, Good sought to write songs that could best be conveyed to live audiences. In fact, many of the record's tracks (including "Little Terror", "North American for Life", "Blue Skies Over Bad Lands", "It's Been A While Since I Was Your Man", and "Ex-Pats of the Blue Mountain Symphony Orchestra") were written and performed live, well in advance of the album's release.

Track listing
All tracks written by Matthew Good, except where noted.

Miscellanea
 "In Love With a Bad Idea" contains lyrics which were once a part of a short poem by Good entitled "Paris Hilton's Vagina".
 "North American for Life" came about as a result of impromptu jam sessions between Good and his live bandmembers while on tour for his previous album, Avalanche.
 "Blue Skies Over Bad Lands" was recorded live in one take.  Livesey recorded a practice take that the band was performing so that mic levels could be set for the "real" recording.  After listening back to the practice take, Good and producer Warne Livesey felt they had captured "something special" and that another take wasn't necessary.
 "Buffalo Seven" receives its title from that of a poster displaying a posse of seven cowboys which Good once hung over his bed.
 "Ex-Pats of the Blue Mountain Symphony Orchestra", is said to be about fights Good was involved in during his youth. It is said to be a homage to The Who, whose influence was cited by Good as an inspiration for the record. The song bears many similarities to The Who's classic, "Won't Get Fooled Again".
 "Hopeless" was not included as part of the official track listing, contrary to Good's wishes, as a result of pressure by his record label who felt that the song was too country for the album.
 "Alert Status Red", "In Love With A Bad Idea", and "Buffalo Seven" were all added after the initial recording session for the album. This was done at the suggestion of the record label, who were concerned that the record lacked any marketable singles.
 Known b-sides for White Light Rock & Roll Review include "Dusk" and "Can't Get Shot in the Back (If You Don't Run)". The former was recorded during the early hours of the morning at the Warehouse Studios in Vancouver on an old piano after initial recording sessions for the album were complete. It was eventually offered for purchase via Puretracks, to coincide with the release of the album's first single, "Alert Status Red". A demo for "Can't Get Shot in the Back (If You Don't Run)" was recorded after the record had been mixed and was streamed on Good's website. The song was later re-recorded properly in a studio for the Hospital Music sessions and offered as a free download for matthewgood.org community members.

Personnel
Matthew Good                           -  vocals, guitar, art direction
Christian Thor Valdson                     -  guitar
Pat Steward                            -  drums, percussion
Rich Priske                            -  bass guitar
Warne Livesey                          -  Producer, engineer, mixer
Scott Ternan                               -  Assistant engineer
Joel Livesey                               -  Assistant engineer
Zach Blackstone                            -  Assistant engineer
Kirk McNally                               -  Assistant engineer
Garnet Armstrong                           -  Album design
Ivan Otis                                  -  Photography
Liza Visagie -  Cover art (Second Beach Three and Second Beach Four)
Mastered by Tim Young at Metropolis, London, UK

Controversy

Alert Status Red is a song about terrorism and violence. The title of the song alludes to the United States terrorist warning system.

The video for this single was released on June 1, 2004, on Matthew Good's website. Matthew Good did not direct this video, and after complaints, he took it down, because in addition to footage shot at Centennial School in Coquitlam, British Columbia, it also contained brief flashes of footage from the Columbine High School massacre.

After thinking on the matter for a while, Good put the video back on his website, with these comments:

"We are members of a violent society. We sell the world the majority of its weaponry; we are the foremost purveyors of nuclear weapons, chemical and biological weapons, and military hardware. And yet we love nothing more than to point the finger at others and claim that they are the cause of the world's love affair with violence. The truth of the matter is that we tend to hide from the fact that we are just as violent, that we are just as capable, that we do not dwell on some higher moral ground from which to cast blame and point fingers. Incidents such as what occurred at Columbine High School demonstrate this, as does the wanton aggression of world superpowers that claim to be acting in self-defense when the truth of the matter is that they're merely reaping the whirlwind of their own abusive conduct. Our responsibility is to wake up and realize these truths."

References

External links
 Alert Status Red at songfacts

2004 albums
Matthew Good albums
Universal Music Canada albums
Albums produced by Warne Livesey